St. Joseph's College, Tiruchirappalli (SJC) is a Catholic college in Tamil Nadu, India. It was established in 1844 by the Society of Jesus (Jesuits) and it is regarded as one of the most prestigious institutions in India. It was affiliated with Madras University in 1869 and is currently an affiliated first-grade college of Bharathidasan University.

History
The Society of Jesus (Jesuits) started St. Joseph's College in 1844. The Society of St. Joseph's, a body registered under the Societies Regulation Act (1860), owns the college. Around 30 Jesuits serve on the staff.

In 2004, the University Grants Commission (UGC) recognised it as a College with Potential for Excellence (CPE). In 2012, the National Assessment and Accreditation Council (NAAC) accredited the college A Grade (3rd Cycle). In 2014, the NAAC gave the college Five Star status. NACC gave it A++ Rank in 2019.

In 2016, the Government of India gave St. Joseph's heritage college status, making it one of twelve colleges in India.

Departments

Biological sciences
Botany – The botany department dates back to 1912 when the study of natural science was introduced. In 1952, the B.A. Botany degree course became B.Sc. Botany, and expanded to include an M.Sc. in Botany in 1958. The department has separate research facilities for molecular biology, physiology, and bioinformatics. By 2015, the department had awarded fifty PhDs and had published 500 research papers and five books. The department's botanical garden is internationally recognized.

Biochemistry – The biochemistry department was started in 1993 at a postgraduate level, becoming a separate department in 2002. It was one of the first independent departments of biochemistry in India. By 2015 the department had trained over 400 biochemists.

Biotechnology – The department of biotechnology was started in 2002 to produce postgraduates for industry, academia, and research centres. Bharathidasan University declared it a research department in 2007, expanding its degrees to include M.Sc,  M.Phil., and Ph.D. To make this program accessible to the rural and middle-class sectors, the tuition is fixed at ₹18,000 per semester.

Computing sciences
Mathematics – The department of mathematics was founded with the college in 1844. In 1911, the University of Madras expanded the program, starting an honours course in mathematics.

Statistics – The statistics department started in 1978 and became a PG department in 1999.  Bharathidasan University recognised It as a research department in 1999.

Computer science – The department of computer science began offering the B.Sc. in 1983. In 1984, it added the MCA, followed by the M.Phil. and PhD in 2002. St. Joseph's College was the first arts and science college in India to offer an MCA. By 2014, the department had produced fifteen PhDs and around 150 M.Phil.s.

Information technology – The department of information technology was established in 2007 as a spin-off from the department of computer science. It offers a BCA, M.Sc. in computer science, and an M.Sc. in information technology. It also offers a postgraduate diploma in computer science and applications, with ICT enabled teaching and learning.

Languages and culture
French – The department of French began with the founding of the college in 1844. At first, French was taught to European officials; later, Indians were admitted into the course.

History – The department of history started with the college in 1844. The B.A. in history was introduced when the college was affiliated with the University of Madras. When in 1911 the college became an arts and science college, an honours course in history was introduced. During this period the library stack room in the history section was flooded with primary sources such as dispatches from the East India Company, annual reports of the Archaeological Survey of India, inscription manuals, and gazetteers. But the number of students dwindled and the department was closed down, with the B.A. honours course continuing up to 1960. The B.A. History was revived in 1977. In 2014, the department offered a B.A., M.A., M.Phil., and Ph.D. It has a strong research orientation, producing 42 PhDs and 320 M.Phil. graduates since 1977. Its faculty has authored sixteen books both in English and Tamil and published seventy research papers. Since October 2004, the department has published Indian Historical Studies, a biannual research journal, with the financial support of  Indian Council of Historical Research, New Delhi.    has been published by the department since October 2004, financially supported by Indian Council of Historical Research, New Delhi.

Tamil – This is one of the college's oldest departments. The B.A. in Tamil was started in 1882, followed by an M.A. in Tamil in 1995. It was recognized as a research department in 1986.

Sanskrit – The department of Sanskrit was started in 1907. 

Hindi – The Hindi department was started in 1944. Since Tamil Nadu is a non-Hindi-speaking state, the department is small.

English – The department of English is the only department that has contact with every student at the undergraduate level. The B.A. in English has been offered since 1962, the M.A. since 1965, and the M.Phil. since 1984.

Management Studies
Economics – The department of economics dates to the college's founding. It was originally part of the history B.A. The department annually organizes a regional-level workshop on research methodology, the CADAR memorial lecture, and intercollegiate ECONS competitions. Dr. M. Sebastian, S.J., former department head, founded the Association of Economists of Tamil Nadu and Pondicherry.   ECONS is a cultural and academic extravaganza organized by the students of the department. It provides an opportunity for students to expose their hidden talents and potential. Students of various colleges of Bharathidasan University compete for the Rolling Shield given by the department.

Commerce – The department of commerce opened in 1948, offering a three-year B.Com. degree. In 1954, it was suspended but revived in 1957. The postgraduate course M.Com. was started in 1988, followed by a full-time M.Phil. course in 2001, and a full-time Ph.D. research programme in 2003. In 2002, a specialized M.A. in transport management was launched. 

Human resource management – The department of society, culture, and civilisation was started in 1983, offering its M.A. degree. Later, the department's nomenclature was changed to social dynamics, and then to human resource management. It is a value-based and socially oriented course. During the summer vacation, the department offers rural and tribal camps, industrial visits, and in-plant and in-house training programmes. All-India educational tours are organized to expose students to diverse cultures.

Business administration – The department of business administration had its origin in the department of economics. It began to function independently in 2002 onwards as St. Joseph's Institute of Management.

Commerce computer applications – The undergraduate degree course in commerce computer application was started in the year 2008, offering a B.Com. C.A. The M.Com. C.A was added in 2011.

School of physical sciences
Physics – A B.A. in physics was started in 1881, a B.Sc. (Hons.) Physics in 1906, and M.Sc. Physics in 1961. The B.A. Physics became B.Sc. Physics in 1930. The University of Madras gave the department recognition for research work leading to a Ph.D. in 1971 and to an M.Phil. in 1977.

Chemistry – The department of chemistry was established in 1906. Both a B.Sc. and an M.Sc. in chemistry are offered.

Electronics – The BSc in electronics was started by the department of physics in 1993. In t1997 the M.Sc. Electronics (Master of Electronics Science) was introduced. The course exposes students to such concepts as digital signal processing (DSP), embedded systems (ES), and VLSI design. The PG students undertake an industrial project in their final semester.

Sports
In 2013 and 2014, the team of St. Joseph's College won the Bharathidasan University Inter-Zonal Inter-Collegiate Men's Football Tournament.

Notable alumni

 A.P.J. Abdul Kalam, former President of India
 Archbishop Michael Augustine, former Archbishop of Pondicherry and Cuddalore.
 G. N. Ramachandran, biophysicist
A. J. John, chief minister of Travancore-Cochin
Sandilyan, writer
Sujatha, writer
S. Ashok Kumar, judge, Madras High Court and Andhra Pradesh High Court
A. Srinivasa Raghavan, Tamil writer
Srirangam Kannan, musician and artist
S. P. Adithanar, lawyer, politician, minister, and founder of the newspaper Dina Thanthi
S. A. Ashokan, actor famous for villain roles in Tamil Film
V. R. Ramachandra Dikshitar, historian, indologist, and dravidologist
 Prabhu Solomon, film director
 D. Napoleon, actor and former Union Minister of State for Social Justice and Empowerment
 N. Gopalaswami, Padma Bhushan award winner and former chief election commissioner of India
 Vasanth, film director
 Major Mariappan Saravanan, Indian army hero of Batalik, recipient of the Vir chakra
 R. S. Krishnan, experimental physicist and the discoverer of Krishnan Effect
 Balasubramanian Viswanathan, material scientist and emeritus professor IIT Madras
 Subramanian Kalyanaraman, neurosurgeon, Shanti Swarup Bhatnagar laureate
 E. S. Raja Gopal, physicist, Shanti Swarup Bhatnagar laureate
 Sam C. S., music director, musician
Arokia Rajiv, Indian athlete
 A. R. Lakshmanan, judge of Supreme court
 Joseph Mundassery, literary critic, Politician

See also
 List of Jesuit sites

References

Jesuit universities and colleges in India
Universities and colleges in Tiruchirappalli
Educational institutions established in 1844
1844 establishments in British India
Colleges affiliated to Bharathidasan University
Academic institutions formerly affiliated with the University of Madras